Sagar Sengupta (born 23 June 1968) is an Indian immunologist, cancer biologist and a scientist at the National Institute of Immunology, India. Known for his studies on tumor suppressor gene and oncogenes, Sengupta is an elected fellow of all the three major Indian science academies namely the National Academy of Sciences, India, the Indian National Science Academy and the Indian Academy of Sciences. The Department of Biotechnology of the Government of India awarded him the National Bioscience Award for Career Development, one of the highest Indian science awards, for his contributions to biosciences, in 2011.

Biography 

Sagara Sengupta, born on 23 June 1968 in the Indian state of West Bengal, earned a postgraduate degree from the University of Calcutta and secured a PhD from the Indian Institute of Science. He did his post doctoral studies at the Institut de Genetique et de Biologie Moleculaire et Cellulaire (IGBMC) in Strasbourg, France and completed it at the National Cancer Institute of the National Institutes of Health. Subsequently, he joined the National Institute of Immunology, India as a faculty where he holds the position of a grade VI staff scientist.

Sengupta resides in Gurgaon in Haryana.

Professional profile 
Sengupta's research focus is on the changes in the signaling pathways during cancer development and he has carried out studies on the tumour suppressor genes and oncogenes. During his post-doctoral days at the National Institutes of Health (NIH), he undertook a project on NIH grant to study the Determination of regulatory mechanisms for BLM helicase. His studies have been documented by way of a number of articles and ResearchGate, an online repository of scientific articles has listed 50 of them. Besides, he has contributed chapters to books published by others. He has also undertaken several projects on behalf of the government agencies such as the Department of Science and Technology, the Department of Biotechnology and the Council of Scientific and Industrial Research as the principal investigator and is associated with the Department of Biotechnology as a member of its Task force on Cancer Biology, the expert committee on Promotion and Popularization of Biotechnology and the Expert Committee for Twinning RD program for North Eastern Region.

Awards and honors 
Sengupta received the Best Thesis Award for his doctoral thesis from the Indian Institute of Science in 1991. The Department of Biotechnology (DBT) of the Government of India awarded him the National Bioscience Award for Career Development, one of the highest Indian science awards in 2011. The National Academy of Sciences, India elected him as a fellow in 2012 and he became an elected fellow of the Indian Academy of Sciences and the Indian National Science Academy in 2017. He is also a member of the Guha Research Conference.

Selected bibliography

Chapters

Articles

See also 

 TP53
 Glucocorticoid receptor

Notes

References

External links 
 

N-BIOS Prize recipients
Indian scientific authors
Living people
20th-century Indian biologists
Indian medical researchers
Fellows of The National Academy of Sciences, India
Scientists from West Bengal
1968 births
Indian immunologists
Cancer researchers
University of Calcutta alumni
Indian Institute of Science alumni
National Institutes of Health people
Fellows of the Indian National Science Academy
Fellows of the Indian Academy of Sciences